The 1990–91 Cypriot First Division was the 52nd season of the Cypriot top-level football league. Apollon Limassol won their 1st title.

Format
Fourteen teams participated in the 1990–91 Cypriot First Division. All teams played against each other twice, once at their home and once away. The team with the most points at the end of the season crowned champions. The last two teams were relegated to the 1991–92 Cypriot Second Division. The 12th-placed team faced the 3rd-placed team of the 1990–91 Cypriot Second Division, in a two-legged relegation play-off for one spot in the 1991–92 Cypriot First Division.

The champions ensured their participation in the 1991–92 European Cup and the runners-up in the 1991–92 UEFA Cup.

Point system
Teams received two points for a win, one point for a draw and zero points for a loss.

Changes from previous season
Evagoras Paphos and Ethnikos Achna were relegated from previous season and played in the 1990–91 Cypriot Second Division. They were replaced by the first two teams of the 1989–90 Cypriot Second Division, EPA Larnaca and APEP.

Stadia and locations

League standings

Results

Relegation play-off
The 12th-placed team Enosis Neon Paralimni faced the 3rd-placed team of the 1990–91 Cypriot Second Division Ethnikos Achna, in a two-legged play-off for one spot in the 1991–92 Cypriot First Division. Enosis Neon Paralimni won both matches and secured their place in the 1991–92 Cypriot First Division.

Enosis Neon Paralimni 4–0 Ethnikos Achna
Ethnikos Achna 1–3 Enosis Neon Paralimni

See also
 Cypriot First Division
 1990–91 Cypriot Cup
 List of top goalscorers in Cypriot First Division by season
 Cypriot football clubs in European competitions

References

Sources

Cypriot First Division seasons
Cyprus
1990–91 in Cypriot football